Fenton Township may refer to the following places in the United States:

 Fenton Township, Whiteside County, Illinois
 Fenton Township, Kossuth County, Iowa
 Fenton Township, Michigan
 Fenton Township, Murray County, Minnesota

Township name disambiguation pages